Myrmapeni is a genus of spiders in the family Salticidae. It was first described in 2016 by Prószyński. , it contains 6 widely disbursed species.

Species
Myrmapeni comprises the following species:
Myrmapeni borneensis (Peckham & Peckham, 1907)
Myrmapeni chickeringi (Galiano, 1969)
Myrmapeni diegoensis (Wanless, 1978)
Myrmapeni penicillata (Mello-Leitão, 1933)
Myrmapeni simplexella (Roewer, 1951)
Myrmapeni sumana (Galiano, 1974)

References

Salticidae
Salticidae genera
Spiders of Asia
Spiders of Central America
Spiders of Brazil
Spiders of Madagascar